The curved point-normal triangle, in short PN triangle, is an interpolation algorithm to retrieve a cubic Bézier triangle from the vertex coordinates of a regular flat triangle and normal vectors. The PN triangle retains the vertices of the flat triangle as well as the corresponding normals. It was first introduced by Saul Kato in 1999  and later independently by A. Vlachos et al. in 2001 and is primarily used in the field of computer graphics. The usage of the PN triangle enables the visualization of triangle based surfaces in a smoother shape at low cost in terms of rendering complexity and time.

Mathematical formulation 
With information of the given vertex positions  of a flat triangle and the according normal vectors  at the vertices a cubic Bézier triangle is constructed.

The first three control points are equal to the given vertices. Six control points related to the triangle edges, i.e.  are computed asThis definition ensures that the original vertex normals are reproduced in the interpolated triangle.

Finally the internal control point is derived from the previously calculated control points as

References 

Geometry